Livdebotnen Cirque is a cirque formed in the northeast side of Mount Flånuten and the west side of Botnfjellet Mountain, in the Humboldt Mountains of Queen Maud Land, Antarctica. It was discovered and photographed by the Third German Antarctic Expedition, 1938–39, was mapped by Norway from air photos and surveys by the Sixth Norwegian Antarctic Expedition, 1956–60, and named Livdebotnen (the shelter cirque).

References

Cirques of Queen Maud Land
Humboldt Mountains (Antarctica)